Clifford L. Jones (December 31, 1927 – May 7, 2008) was an American politician and Pennsylvania Republican Party chairman. During his career he worked as secretary of commerce, labor and industry and environmental resources, and also chaired the Public Utility Commission.

On 7 May 2008 he died of prostate cancer.

References

1927 births
2008 deaths
Pennsylvania Republicans
Deaths from prostate cancer